1996 Kashima Antlers season

Review and events

League results summary

League results by round

Competitions

Domestic results

J.League

Emperor's Cup

J.League Cup

Suntory Cup

Player statistics

 † player(s) joined the team after the opening of this season.

Transfers

In:

Out:

Transfers during the season

In
 Daijirō Takakuwa (from Yokohama Marinos)
 Rodrigo Fabiano Mendes (from Grêmio on August)
 Rodrigo José Carbone (on September)

Out
 Mozer (on May)
 Leonardo (on July)

Awards

J.League Most Valuable Player:  Jorginho
J.League Best XI:  Naoki Soma,  Jorginho

References

Other pages
 J. League official site
 Kashima Antlers official site

Kashima Antlers
Kashima Antlers seasons